Heinz Wyss (born 10 December 1945) is a Swiss athlete. He competed in the men's pole vault at the 1968 Summer Olympics.

References 

1945 births
Living people
Athletes (track and field) at the 1968 Summer Olympics
Swiss male pole vaulters
Olympic athletes of Switzerland
Place of birth missing (living people)